Carmen Ana Culpeper served as the first female Secretary of the Puerto Rico Department of the Treasury during the administration of Governor Carlos Romero Barceló.  During the governorship of Pedro Rosselló, she served as the president of the then government-owned Puerto Rico Telephone Company.

In addition to serving as Regional Director of the United States Small Business Administration, she served as a member of the Board of Directors of Centennial Corporation and of Banco Santander Puerto Rico.

She currently works as a financial consultant.

Culpeper holds an MBA from the Wharton School of the University of Pennsylvania.

See also

List of Puerto Ricans
History of women in Puerto Rico

References 

Puerto Rican businesspeople
Living people
Year of birth missing (living people)
Wharton School of the University of Pennsylvania alumni
Puerto Rican women in business
Secretaries of Treasury of Puerto Rico